Quilt Museum may refer to:

The National Quilt Museum in Paducah, Kentucky, United States
The Quilt Museum and Gallery in York, England
The Quilters Hall of Fame in Marion, Indiana, United States